The princedom of San Donato was created by Leopold II, Grand Duke of Tuscany, for the Russian Italophile Anatoly Nikolaievich Demidov in 1840, so that Demidov could marry Mathilde Bonaparte, niece of Napoleon, without her losing her title of Princess. 

The title was never recognized in Russia. It was named after Villa San Donato, the Demidov family's villa, built by the first prince's father near Florence.

List of holders

Anatoly Nikolaievich Demidov, 1st Prince of San Donato (1813-1870), Prince from 1840 creation, died without legitimate issue
Pavel Pavlovich Demidov, 2nd Prince of San Donato (1839-1885), nephew of the former
Elim Pavlovich Demidov, 3rd Prince of San Donato (1868-1943), son of the former
Anatoly Pavlovich Demidov, 4th Prince of San Donato (1874-1943), half-brother of the former